was a Public junior college in Mihama-ku, Chiba, Japan, established in 1981. It was merged into Chiba Prefectural University of Health Sciences in 2009 and closed in March 2011.

References

External links
 Official website 

Japanese junior colleges
Educational institutions established in 1981
Public universities in Japan
Universities and colleges in Chiba Prefecture
Nursing schools in Japan
1981 establishments in Japan